Statistics of Primera Fuerza in season 1924-25.

Overview
It was contested by 7 teams, and América won the championship.

League standings
(All clubs from México City)

Two points and a score of 1-0 awarded to teams who won by default vs. Club España, Aurrerá and Asturias which withdraw on February 29, 1925.

Top goalscorers
Players sorted first by goals scored, then by last name.

References
Mexico - List of final tables (RSSSF)

1924-25
Mex
1924–25 in Mexican football